Inese Laizāne (born 15 August 1971 in Balvi) is a Latvian actress and politician.

References 

1971 births
Living people
People from Balvi Municipality
All for Latvia! politicians
National Alliance (Latvia) politicians
Deputies of the 10th Saeima
Deputies of the 11th Saeima
Deputies of the 12th Saeima
Women deputies of the Saeima
Latvian stage actresses
Latvian film actresses
Latvian television actresses
20th-century Latvian actresses
21st-century Latvian actresses
University of Daugavpils alumni

21st-century Latvian women politicians